The OM System OM-5 is a mirrorless interchangeable-lens camera with a Micro Four Thirds mount, announced by OM Digital Solutions on 26 October 2022 and due to be released in November. The lens with M.ZUIKO DIGITAL ED 14-150mm F4.0-5.6 II kit, and a lens kit with the M.ZUIKO DIGITAL ED 12-45mm F4.0 PRO, will be available in December. This was the first camera to be branded "OM SYSTEM" for the EVF, replacing the old "OLYMPUS" branding. In keeping with the "camera you can take with you" philosophy, the OM-1's functions such as 5-axis image stabilisation, Computational Photo, Hi-Res Shot, dustproof, water-proof and low temperature resistance were inherited, while a compact and lightweight body was pursued.

References

External links 

 

OM-05
Cameras introduced in 2022